Elizaveta Grigoryevna Dorfman, or Gerševna (c.1899 - c.1942) was a Jewish Russian artist.

Life
Most sources give Dorfman's birth year as 1899, but her World War II refugee registration card gives her birthyear as 1898.

She provided a cover illustration for Sounding Shell (1921 or 1922), a collection of poetry by the circle surrounding Nikolai Gumilev. She also designed a poster for the 1922 film Blood and Sand.

In the late 1930s Dorfman was living in Sochi. World War II forced her into exile as a Jewish refugee in Tashkent, Uzbekistan . She died there, in 1941 or 1942.

References

1890s births
Year of birth uncertain
1942 deaths
Year of death uncertain
20th-century Russian artists
20th-century Russian women artists
20th-century Russian Jews